Le Rouget (Languedocien: Lo Roget) is a former commune in the département of Cantal in south-central France. On 1 January 2016, it was merged into the new commune Le Rouget-Pers.

Le Rouget, having grown from a hamlet as a result of coming of the railway, will not be found on many 19th-century maps. It was not granted commune status (and, with it, the right to elect a mayor of its own) until September 1945, but is today a more important commercial and employment centre than the nearby historic cantonal centres of Saint-Mamet-la-Salvetat and Laroquebrou, although it lacks their architectural and historical interest.

A market is held every Sunday morning.

Population

See also
Communes of the Cantal department

References

Former communes of Cantal
Populated places disestablished in 2016